Curnow is a surname of Cornish origin and may refer to:

People
 Josh Curnow  (1989- present), Cornish multitalented Musician and Song writer
 Allen Curnow (1911–2001), New Zealand poet and journalist
 Andrew Curnow (born 1950), Australian Anglican bishop
 Ann Curnow (1935–2011), English judge
 Betty Curnow (1911–2005), New Zealand artist
 Bob Curnow (born 1941), American musician
 Charlie Curnow (born 1997), Australian rules footballer
 Ed Curnow (born 1989), Australian rules footballer
 Esmond Curnow (born 1946), Australian politician
 Eugene Curnow (1925–2010), American veterinarian
 Neil Curnow (born 1982), English cricketer
 Robyn Curnow (born 1972), South African journalist
 Rupert Curnow (1898–1950), Australian politician
 Syd Curnow (1907–1986), South African cricketer
 William Curnow (1832–1903), Australian journalist
 Wystan Curnow (born 1939), New Zealand writer

Places
 "Curnow", an anglicised spelling of Kernow, the Cornish word for Cornwall
 Curnow Range, mountain range in Nevada